Taisto Ilmari Kangasniemi (2 April 1924 – 31 October 1997) was a Finnish heavyweight wrestler. He competed in Greco-Roman and freestyle events at the 1948, 1952, 1952 and 1964 Summer Olympics, and won a freestyle bronze medal in 1956; he placed sixth in the freestyle in 1952 and fourth-sixth in Greco-Roman contests in 1952 and 1956. His best result at the world championships was fourth place in 1953 in Greco-Roman wrestling. Domestically he won eight Greco-Roman (1950–51, 1953, 1955, and 1962–63) and two freestyle titles (1953–54).

After retiring from competitions Kangasniemi worked as a sports instructor and functionary. He was president and then honorary president of Tampereen Painiseura, a wrestling club he co-founded.

References

1924 births
1997 deaths
Olympic wrestlers of Finland
Wrestlers at the 1948 Summer Olympics
Wrestlers at the 1952 Summer Olympics
Wrestlers at the 1956 Summer Olympics
Wrestlers at the 1964 Summer Olympics
Finnish male sport wrestlers
Olympic bronze medalists for Finland
Olympic medalists in wrestling
Medalists at the 1956 Summer Olympics
People from Kankaanpää
Sportspeople from Satakunta
20th-century Finnish people